This is a list of the Belgian federal, regional, and community governments.

Federal government 

The Belgian Federal Government is the executive branch of the whole Kingdom of Belgium.

Flemish government 

The Flemish Government is the executive branch of both the Flemish Region and the Flemish Community.

Government of the French Community 

The Government of the French Community is the executive branch of the French Community.

Government of the German-speaking Community 

The Government of the German-speaking Community is the executive branch of the German-speaking Community.

Walloon Government 

The Walloon Government is the executive branch of Wallonia.

Government of the Brussels-Capital Region 

The Government of the Brussels-Capital Region is the executive branch of the Brussels-Capital Region.

See also 
 List of national governments
 Politics of Belgium

External links 
The Belgian Federal Government – Composition

G
Belgium